When a Knight Won His Spurs is a children's hymn written by Jan Struther and set to a folk melody (Stowey) and harmonised by Ralph Vaughan Williams. The hymn first appeared in Songs of Praise in 1931.

The hymn is sometimes performed by folk singers on account of the folk origins of its tune, notably by Martin Simpson during Prom 5 (Folk day - part 2) in the BBC Proms on July 20, 2008.

An up tempo version can be found on Blyth Power's 1990 album Alnwick and Tyne.

Lyrics 
The lyrics in their original form are:
When a knight won his spurs, in the stories of old,
He was gentle and brave, he was gallant and bold
With a shield on his arm and a lance in his hand,
For God and for valour he rode through the land.

No charger have I, and no sword by my side,
Yet still to adventure and battle I ride,
Though back into storyland giants have fled,
And the knights are no more and the dragons are dead.

Let faith be my shield and let joy be my steed
'Gainst the dragons of anger, the ogres of greed;
And let me set free with the sword of my youth,
From the castle of darkness, the power of the truth.

Recordings

Libera (2004), Free, EMI Classics cat. no. 57823.
Emilia Dalby (2009) "Emilia" Signum Classics cat no. SIGCD 141

Other usage

This hymn was used as part of the poem entitled "Headmaster's Hymn" by Alan Ahlberg in his book entitled Please Mrs Butler.  The poem is about the hymn being sung by the school in an assembly, with constant interruption from the headmaster as a few children are misbehaving.

References

 Emilia Dalby, Sarum Voices, John Touhey (narrater) City Waites arranged Ben Lamb
Signum Records SIGCD141 2009

External links
 
Mike Lindup (1990). Features the third verse of the above hymn in the song "Changes" from the album of the same name (Polydor – 843 514-2)
Libera (choir):
2003 – When a Knight Won His Spurs (Temple Church, London; soloist: Ben Crawley). Youtube, 2006. 
2005 –  When A Knight Won His Spurs (Hever Castle; soloist: Edward Day). LiberaUSA, 2006.
2007 – When a Knight won his Spurs (Church of the Holy Trinity, Stratford-upon-Avon; soloist: Edward Day). YouTube, 2007.

English Christian hymns
Hymn tunes
1931 songs
20th-century hymns